The First Baptist Church is a historic Southern Baptist church in Lake Wales, Florida. It is located at 338 East Central Avenue. On August 31, 1990, it was added to the U.S. National Register of Historic Places.

References

External links
 Polk County listings at National Register of Historic Places
 Florida's Office of Cultural and Historical Programs
 Polk County listings
 First Baptist Church

Baptist churches in Florida
Buildings and structures in Lake Wales, Florida
National Register of Historic Places in Polk County, Florida
Churches on the National Register of Historic Places in Florida
Churches in Polk County, Florida
Southern Baptist Convention churches